Elmbank is a building in Luss, Argyll and Bute, Scotland. It is a Category C listed building, dating to the early 19th century.

The building, a single-storey cottage located on Church Road, dates to the early 19th century and has later alterations and additions. A notable feature is its twelve-pane timber sash and case windows.

See also
List of listed buildings in Luss, Argyll and Bute

References

External links
Luss, Elmbank – Canmore
View of the building – Google Street View, October 2016

19th-century establishments in Scotland
Listed buildings in Luss, Argyll and Bute
Category C listed buildings in Argyll and Bute